Straumgjerde is a village in Sykkylven Municipality in Møre og Romsdal county, Norway. The village is located where the lake Fitjavatnet empties into the Sykkylvsfjorden.

References

Villages in Møre og Romsdal
Sykkylven